Malti Devi (5 August 1968 – 6 September 1999) was a political and social worker and a Member of Parliament elected from the Nawada constituency in the Indian  state of Bihar on  the Rashtriya Janata Dal party ticket.

Early life
Malti Devi was born on 5 August 1968 in the Manglagori village in Gaya district in the Indian state of Bihar. She was married to Bhubaneshwar Prasad on 4 February 1984 and has two sons. She left her school education in 1980.

Politics and activism
She led the Farmers Movement and was a member of Communist Party of India (Marxist–Leninist). She advocated for women, landless farmers and tribals in central and south Bihar. She lef the C.P.I. (ML) in 1995. She was a member of the Bihar Legislative Assembly from 1995 to 1998 and was elected to the 12th Lok Sabha in 1998. She was also a member of Committee on Urban and Rural Development and its Sub-Committee-I on Urban Affairs and Employment and a member of Consultative Committee, Ministry of Health and Family welfare.

Death
Devi died on 6 September 1999 at her Delhi residence due to cancer.

References

Lok Sabha members from Bihar
India MPs 1998–1999
Women members of the Bihar Legislative Assembly
People from Nawada district
Articles created or expanded during Women's History Month (India) - 2014
People from Gaya district
1968 births
1999 deaths
Communist Party of India (Marxist–Leninist) Liberation politicians
Rashtriya Janata Dal politicians
20th-century Indian women politicians
20th-century Indian politicians